Samantha Jade Logan (born October 27, 1996) is an American actress and dancer. She is best known for her lead role as Olivia Baker in The CW series All American, Nina Jones in the second season of the Netflix series 13 Reasons Why, and Tia Stephens in the Freeform series The Fosters. Her other notable roles include Teen Wolf, Melissa & Joey, General Hospital and 666 Park Avenue.

Life and career
Logan was born in Boston, Massachusetts, of Irish and Trinidadian descent. She attended the Professional Performing Arts School and Fiorello H. LaGuardia High School. After appearing in an episode of Law & Order: Special Victims Unit, she was cast in a series regular role opposite Vanessa Williams in the ABC drama series 666 Park Avenue playing the role of Nona Clark. The series was canceled after one season in 2013. Logan later was cast in the ABC daytime soap opera General Hospital as Taylor DuBois.

In 2014, Logan appeared in the comedy film Alexander and the Terrible, Horrible, No Good, Very Bad Day and had a recurring roles on ABC Family sitcom Melissa & Joey, and MTV teen drama Teen Wolf. From 2014 to 2015, she had a recurring role as Tia Stephens in the ABC Family drama The Fosters. In 2015, Logan was regular cast member in the unaired ABC prime time soap opera Members Only and in 2016 guest starred on the 300th episode of NCIS. Also in 2016, Logan starred in the NBC soap opera pilot Cruel Intentions.

In 2018, Logan had a recurring role in the Netflix teen drama series 13 Reasons Why and later began starring in The CW sports drama series All American.

Filmography

References

External links
 

1996 births
Living people
Actresses from Boston
American child actresses
American film actresses
American soap opera actresses
American television actresses
21st-century American actresses
American people of Irish descent
American people of Trinidad and Tobago descent
Fiorello H. LaGuardia High School alumni